Turovsky is a Czech, Slovak, Ukrainian, Belarusian and Russian surname, it may refer to:

Turovsky. Turovska, Turovskaya are Ukrainian feminine variation.
 Kirill Turovsky (1130-1182), Russian Orthodox priest and saint
 Genya Turovskaya, American poet
 JoAnn Turovsky, American musician-harpist
 Mikhaylo Turovskyy (born 1933), Ukrainian-American artist and writer 
 Roman Turovsky-Savchuk, Ukrainian-American artist and composer
 Yuli Turovsky (1939-2013), Canadian cellist and conductor

See also 
 Wólka Turowska, a village in the Gmina Grójec
 Turowski
 Turowicz
 Turów
 Turov
 Turaŭ (Turaw)

Polish-language surnames

pl:Turowski